Auriac-Lagast is a commune in the Aveyron department in the Occitanie region of southern France.

The inhabitants of the commune are known as Aurigastois or Aurigastoises.

Geography

Auriac-Lagast is located some 27 km south of Rodez and 35 km north by north-east of Carmaux. Access to the commune is by the D522 road from Cassagnes-Bégonhès in the north-west, which passes through the heart of the commune and the village and continues south-east to Durenque. The D25 passes inside the eastern border of the commune as it goes from Salmiech to Villefranche-de-Panat. Apart from the village, there are the hamlets of:

Belle Sagne,
Belvezet,
La Cailholie,
Castanies,
La Garde,
Ginestous,
La Malborie,
Moncan,
Saint-Leon,
Le Roube,
La Roque,
Randan,
Les Salettes,

The commune is almost entirely farmland with a few forests.

The Gladou river rises in the east of the commune and flows west, forming part of the western border as it then flows north to join the Céar south of Cassagnes-Bégonhès. The Hunargues and the Ruisseau des Gazelles also rise in the commune and flow west to join the Gladou in the commune. The Ruisseau du Lagast rises in the south-eastern corner of the commune and forms most of the eastern border as it flows north to join the Céor. The Ruisseau de Miège Sole crosses the eastern arm of the commune and forms part of the northern border of the arm before continuing north to join the Ruisseau du Lagast just north of the commune.

Neighbouring communes and villages

Administration

List of Successive Mayors

Demography
In 2017 the commune had 229 inhabitants.

Distribution of Age Groups

Percentage Distribution of Age Groups in Auriac-Lagast and Aveyron Department in 2017

Source: INSEE

Sites and monuments

The Parish Church of Saint-Léonard of Auriac: its steeple was struck by lightning and restored.
Moncan (private area)
The Chateau of Randan (private property - owned by the family of Raymond Bonnefous)

See also
Communes of the Aveyron department

Bibliography
Christian-Pierre Bedel, preface by Bernard Destours, Cassanhas, Arviu, Auriac, Caumont, La Grand'Vila, Saumièg, Senta-Jaleda / Christian-Pierre Bedel e los estatjants del canton de Cassanhas, Rodez, Mission départementale de la culture, 1996, Al canton collection, 240 pages, ill., cov. ill., 28 cm, ISSN 1151-8375, BnF 366930046

References

External links
Auriac-Lagast on Géoportail, National Geographic Institute (IGN) website 
Auriac on the 1750 Cassini Map

Communes of Aveyron